St Catharine's College is a constituent college of the University of Cambridge. Founded in 1473 as Katharine Hall, it adopted its current name in 1860. The college is nicknamed "Catz". The college is located in the historic city-centre of Cambridge, and lies just south of King's College and across the street from Corpus Christi College. The college is notable for its open court (rather than closed quadrangle) that faces towards Trumpington Street.

St Catharine's is unique in being the only Oxbridge college founded by the serving head of another college.

Governance and community
St Catharine's college community consists of approximately 1000 Fellows, graduate and undergraduate students, and staff. The college is led by a Master, and the college is run by a governing body comprising the official and professorial Fellows of the college, chaired by the Master.  The college has had 39 Masters since its foundation in 1473. The current Master, Sir Mark Welland took up office on 1 October 2016. In February 2023, the college announced the pre-election of Sir John Benger as the 40th Master.

History

Foundation

Robert Woodlark, Provost of King’s College, had begun preparations for the founding of a new college as early as 1459 when he bought tenements on which the new college could be built. The preparation cost him a great deal of his private fortune (he was suspected of diverting King's College funds), and he was forced to scale down the foundation to only three fellows. He stipulated that they must study theology and philosophy only. The college was established as "Lady Katharine Hall" in 1473. The college received its royal charter of incorporation in 1475 from Edward IV. Woodlark may have chosen the name in homage to the mother of Henry VI who was Catherine of Valois, although it is more likely that it was named as part of the Renaissance cult of Catherine of Alexandria, a patron saint of learning. The college was formally founded on St Catherine’s day (25 November) 1473. The Catharine wheel, a symbol of the saint's martyrdom, appears on the college arms. 

The initial foundation was not well-provided for. Woodlark was principally interested in the welfare of fellows and the college had no undergraduates for many years. By 1550, however, there was a number of junior students and the focus of the college changed to that of teaching undergraduates.

The Robinson vote
In 1861, the master, Henry Philpott became Bishop of Worcester, and stood down. Two of the five Fellows of the college stood for election: Charles Kirkby Robinson and Francis Jameson. Jameson voted for his rival; however, Robinson voted for himself and won the election. The episode brought the college into some disrepute for some years. Robinson's long tenure as master only ended with his death in 1909.

Expansion and modern day
As the college entered the 17th century, it was still one of the smallest colleges in Cambridge. However, a series of prudent masters and generous benefactors were to change the fortunes of the college and expand its size. Rapid growth in the fellowship and undergraduate population made it necessary to expand the college, and short-lived additions were made in 1622. By 1630 the college began to demolish its existing buildings which were decaying, and started work on a new court. In 1637 the college came into possession of the George Inn (later the Bull Hotel) on Trumpington Street. Behind this Inn was a stables which was already famous for the practice of its manager, Thomas Hobson, not to allow a hirer to take any horse other than the one longest in the stable, leading to the expression "Hobson's choice", meaning "take it or leave it". The college building Hobson is named after Thomas Hobson whose name means son of Hobs with Hob being short for hobgoblin or the devil.

The period of 1675 to 1757 saw the redevelopment of the college's site into a large three-sided court, one of only four at Oxbridge colleges; the others are at Jesus and Downing at Cambridge and Worcester, St Catharine’s sister college at Oxford. Proposals for a range of buildings to complete the fourth side of the court have been made on many occasions.

The college was granted new statutes in 1860 and adopted its current name. In 1880, a movement to merge the college with King’s College began. The two colleges were adjacent and it seemed a solution to King's need for more rooms and St Catharine's need for a more substantial financial basis. However, the Master (Charles Kirkby Robinson) was opposed and St Catharine's eventually refused.

In 1966 a major rebuilding project took place under the mastership of Professor E. E. Rich. This saw the creation of a new larger hall, new kitchens and an accommodation block shared between St Catharine's and King's College. Pressure on accommodation continued to grow, and in 1981 further accommodation was built at St Chad's on Grange Road, with further rooms added there in 1998. In 2013 the College completed the building of a new lecture theatre, college bar and JCR.

In 1979, the membership of the college was broadened to welcome female students, and in 2006 the first woman was appointed as Master of the college, Dame Jean Thomas.

A history of the college was written by W. H. S. Jones in 1936.

In 2015, St Catharine's became the first college in Cambridge to implement a gender-neutral dress code for formal hall.

During the 2020 COVID-19 pandemic, St Catharine's, in collaboration with Cambridge Women's Aid, allowed women who were escaping domestic abuse to stay in college accommodation. Between 27 April and 3 September, women and children were provided with accommodation for a combined 1,456 nights.

From early 2020, construction works have occurred to renovate St Catharine's Main Hall as part of the "Central Spaces projects". A temporary hall was erected on the main court and named "Catzebo", a portmanteau of "Catz" and "gazebo" for its tent-like appearance. The name was chosen by the Head Porter following an advisory student vote in which "Catzebo" was put forward by Robson Tebbutt, a student.

Academics

Historically, St Catharine's has generally been placed in the top third of the Tompkins Table (the annual league table of Cambridge colleges), though its position tends to vary year on year. In 2014, its position slipped to 21st, but rose to 13th in 2015 with more than 25% of students gaining First-class honours, and it has further risen to 10th in 2018 with more than 30% gaining a First. The first time the college had been placed at the top of the Tompkins Table was in 2005. Between 1997 and 2010, the college averaged 9th of 29 colleges.

Student life

The college maintains a friendly rivalry with Queens’ College after the construction of the main court of St Catharine's College on Cambridge’s former High Street relegated one side of Queens' College into a back alley. A more modern rivalry with Robinson College resulted from the construction in the 1970s of a modern block of flats named St Chad’s (in which the rooms are octagonal to resemble the wheel on the college crest) by the University Library.

The college has a strong reputation in hockey and racquet sports, in part due to its facilities for these sports including grass tennis courts and an astroturf hockey pitch. The football club is one of the largest sporting clubs at the college. In 2018 the first team were in the 2nd division and the second team were in the 4th division. The team enjoyed its most dominant years in the late 1970s winning Cuppers 4 times consecutively from 1975-1978. St Catharine's College Boat Club, the college boat club, hosts the Cardinals Regatta each year, in which teams compete along a short course in fancy dress with an emphasis on bribery to secure victory. The college's Boat Club is moderately strong, with both Men's and Women's 1st boats generally residing in the middle of the 1st division of the May Bumps races.

The college hosts several other notable societies. The Shirley Society is the college literary society, the oldest in Cambridge; it hosts significant figures from the arts. The college-based girls' choir is the first of its kind in a UK university and is composed of girls aged 8–14 from local schools.

Notable alumni

See also
 List of Masters of St Catharine's College, Cambridge
 :Category: Fellows of St Catharine's College, Cambridge
 List of Honorary Fellows of St Catharine's College, Cambridge
 Organ scholar
 St Catherine's College, Oxford

References

Further reading

External links

 Official St Catharine's College website
 St Catharine's College JCR website

 
1473 establishments in England
Colleges of the University of Cambridge
Grade I listed buildings in Cambridge
Grade I listed educational buildings
Educational institutions established in the 15th century
Organisations based in Cambridge with royal patronage